Tall Bargah (also Romanized as Tall Bārgāh, Tol Bārgāh, and Tal Bārgāh; also known as Nūl Bargā, Tulbargāh, and Tūl Bargeh) is a village in Kuhestan Rural District, Rostaq District, Darab County, Fars Province, Iran. At the 2006 census, its population was 455, in 107 families.

References 

Populated places in Darab County